Light Stars FC is a Seychelles based football club, they are playing in the Seychelles League.

The team is based in Grand'Anse Praslin in Praslin island.

Stadium
Currently, the team plays at the 2,000 capacity Stade d’Amitié.

References

External links
Soccerway

Football clubs in Seychelles